This is a chronological list of films that make up the Cinema of Slovakia. There may be an early overlap especially between Slovak and Hungarian films when the two nations shared the Kingdom of Hungary, later between Slovak and Czech films when the two nations shared Czecho-Slovakia or Czechoslovakia. The list should attempt to document films that are either Slovak-produced or associated with Slovak culture. Please see the detailed A-Z of films currently covered on Wikipedia at :Category:Slovak films, List of Czechoslovak films, and :Category:Czech films.

Before 1920

1920s

1930s

1940s

1950s

1960s

1970s

1980s

1990s

Minority co-production participation:

2000s
List of Slovak films of the 2000s

2010s
List of Slovak films of the 2010s

2020s
List of Slovak films of the 2020s

External links
 Slovenská filmová databáza